Sir William Gardiner, 1st Baronet (9 May 1628 – 23 June 1691) was an English politician who sat in the House of Commons  in 1660.

Gardiner was the son of Robert Gardiner of Wigan and his wife Mary Palmer.

In 1660, Gardiner was elected Member of Parliament for Wigan in the Convention Parliament. He was made a Knight of the Bath at the coronation of King Charles II and was created Baronet of Roche Court in the same year on 2 December 1660.
 
Gardiner died at the age of 63.

Gardiner married Anne Brocas, daughter  Robert Brocas of Beaurepaire, Hampshire, and had two sons Sir Brocas Gardiner, 2nd Baronet and Bernard.

References

1628 births
1691 deaths
People from Wigan
English MPs 1660
Knights of the Bath
Baronets in the Baronetage of England
Cloth merchants
17th-century English businesspeople